Upside Down; or, the Human Flies is an 1899 British short  silent drama film, directed by Walter R. Booth, featuring a conjuror sending his audience to the ceiling. The film, "exploits a very simple illusion: that of filming with the camera turned upside-down so that the actors appear to be performing on the ceiling," and according to Michael Brooke of BFI Screenonline, "the effectiveness of the final result is such that nearly seventy years later Stanley Kubrick used the same technique in 2001: A Space Odyssey (1968)." The conjuror was reputedly played by Booth himself.

References

External links

1899 films
British black-and-white films
British silent short films
British drama films
Articles containing video clips
Films about magic and magicians
Films directed by Walter R. Booth
1890s drama films
1899 short films
1890s British films
Silent drama films